The Society for Cardiovascular Magnetic Resonance (SCMR) is an international non-profit medical society based in Mt. Royal, New Jersey, in the United States.  It was established as international representative and advocate for  physicians, scientists, and technologists working in cardiovascular magnetic resonance (CMR) imaging.  It works to improve patient outcomes through education, training, standards, research and development. The society has published more than 30 professional guidelines and expert consensus statements to help standardize and guide education, research and patient management with CMR. The society's members are physicians, scientists, technologists and trainees. In 2018, it is led by Matthias Stuber.

History
The society was established in 1994.  Its first president was  Gerald M. Pohost, elected in 1996.

In 1998, the organization began holding annual scientific meetings.  The meeting has grown to include a conference with about 1000 attendees. SCMR has organized joint scientific meetings with EACVI, as well as Joint Workshops with ISMRM.

Working groups 
The society has regional working groups and affiliates in Asia, Australia/New Zealand, Canada, Europe, India, Latin America, the Middle East, and the United States. The role of these working groups is to promote CMR in these regions. There are also special interest groups focusing on Pediatrics/Congenital and Interventional CMR.

The Canadian Society for Cardiovascular Magnetic Resonance, an independent chapter of SCMR, was established in 2005; in 2013 it published guidelines for the analysis and reporting of CMR studies.

Organization 
The SCMR is governed by its officers, including the president, vice-president, secretary, vice-secretary, past-president, and the board of trustees.

Gold Medal Award 
The Society presents an annual award, The Gold Medal Award, for distinguished and extraordinary service to the field of CMR and to the Society.  Recipients have been:

Publications 
The society publishes an open access journal, the Journal of Cardiovascular Magnetic Resonance.

SCMR has worked with other cardiovascular societies (e.g. AHA, ACC, SCCT, ASE, ASNC) in establishing cardiovascular guidelines and appropriateness use criteria. These guidelines and consensus statements are based on published research studies and expert opinions in the field to help improve cardiovascular patient care.  SCMR also joined the Choosing Wisely campaign in 2014 to reduce excessive testing.

The society also provides online introductory training in Cardiovascular Magnetic Resonance.

References

External links 
 SCMR Society for Cardiovascular Magnetic Resonance

Medical associations based in the United States
Heart disease organizations
Magnetic resonance imaging
Medical and health organizations based in New Jersey